Trichopsomyia flavitarsis is a European species of hoverfly.

Description
External images For terms see Morphology of Diptera
Wing length 4–6 mm. Frons and face glittering black. Tergite 2 with a pair of yellow marks, without dust spots. Male tarsus 3 broad and flat, with snow-white pilosity. See references for determination.

Habits
A wetland and woodland species.

Distribution
Palearctic Fennoscandia South to the Pyrenees and north Spain. Ireland eastwards through North Europe and mountainous regions of Central Europe into European Russia and onto the Pacific coast.

References

Diptera of Europe
Pipizinae
Insects described in 1822
Taxa named by Johann Wilhelm Meigen